Santos Seda, known as "Papichy", is a Puerto Rican politician who served as mayor of Guánica. Seda is affiliated with the New Progressive Party (PNP) and has served as mayor since 2013.

References

Living people
Mayors of places in Puerto Rico
New Progressive Party (Puerto Rico) politicians
People from Guánica, Puerto Rico
Year of birth missing (living people)